The Aragua Municipality is one of the 21 municipalities (municipios) that makes up the eastern Venezuelan state of Anzoátegui and, according to the 2011 census by the National Institute of Statistics of Venezuela, the municipality has a population of 29,268. The town of Aragua de Barcelona is the shire town of the Aragua Municipality.

Demographics
The Aragua Municipality, according to a 2007 population estimate by the National Institute of Statistics of Venezuela, has a population of 32,558 (up from 28,723 in 2000). This amounts to 2.2% of the state's population.

Government
The mayor of the Aragua Municipality is Juan de Dios Figueredo, re-elected on 23 November 2008 with 52% of the vote. The municipality is divided into two parishes; Capital Aragua and Cachipo.

See also
Anzoátegui
Municipalities of Venezuela

References

External links
aragua-anzoategui.gob.ve 

Municipalities of Anzoategui